The 2009 SCCA Speed World Challenge was the 20th Speed World Challenge season. began March 18, 2009, and was completed on October 11, after 10 rounds. The Grand Touring championship was won by Brandon Davis driving a Ford Mustang GT, and the Touring Car championship was won by Pierre Kleinubing driving an Acura TSX. It was the last season under the Speed Channel sponsorship.

Schedule
Five of the rounds were held as an undercard to the American Le Mans Series: Sebring, Long Beach, Mid-Ohio, Road America, Road Atlanta and Laguna Seca. The Sebring, Mid-Ohio, Road Atlanta and Laguna Seca races were also shared with the Atlantic Championship, as well as the Autobahn date. The race at New Jersey was held as an undercard to the Grand-Am Rolex Sports Car Series.

Race results

Drivers

Grand Touring (top 15)

Touring Car (top 15)

Manufacturer

Grand Touring

Touring Car

References

External links
The SCCA Pro Racing World Challenge official website
Roster

Speed World
GT World Challenge America